Paul Allen Nicholls (10 November 1946 – 17 January 2009) was an Australian sportsman who played for Western Australia in first-class cricket during the 1970s and played Australian rules football with the East Fremantle Football Club.

Nicholls, a right-arm offspinner, started his career in the 1971/72 Sheffield Shield season and featured in the Western Australian side for much of the following two competitions. He then spent over four years out of the team before returning in 1977/78, but re-cement his place as the state's premier spinner.

He claimed eight wickets on his first-class debut, against South Australia at the Adelaide Oval, including a five wicket haul in the second innings. Despite his efforts, Western Australia lost the match by 25 runs. Amongst his victims in first-class cricket were the Pakistani pair of Zaheer Abbas and Mushtaq Mohammad, whom he dismissed in a tour match for Western Australia against the touring nation. In all he was part of three successful Sheffield Shield campaigns.

Nicholls spent the 1972 and 1973 English summers playing for the Haslingden Cricket Club in the Lancashire League.

Nicholls was also a good Australian rules footballer and played for East Fremantle in the Western Australian Football League. He holds a place in the club's history for his performance in the 1974 WAFL Grand Final where he kicked four goals from full-forward to help East Fremantle defeat Perth.

Later in his life, Nicholls was a successful magistrate in Western Australia before he died of cancer in 2009.

References

1946 births
2009 deaths
Australian cricketers
Western Australia cricketers
Australian rules footballers from Fremantle
East Fremantle Football Club players
Cricketers from Fremantle
Sportsmen from Western Australia
Hertfordshire cricketers
Australian expatriate cricketers in the United Kingdom
Australian expatriate sportspeople in England